Rolandas Gimbutis (born 11 February 1981 in Vilnius, Lithuania) is a swimmer from Lithuania. He participated in the 2000, 2004, and 2008 Summer Olympics. National records holder.

Oakland Undercurrent
Currently, Rolandas is an accomplished swim coach for the well-known Oakland Undercurrents.

References

External links
 
 
 
 

1981 births
Living people
Lithuanian male freestyle swimmers
Olympic swimmers of Lithuania
Swimmers at the 2000 Summer Olympics
Swimmers at the 2004 Summer Olympics
Swimmers at the 2008 Summer Olympics
Sportspeople from Vilnius
California Golden Bears men's swimmers